Meigs may refer to:

Places
 Meigs, Georgia
 Meigs, Ohio
 Meigs Field, former Chicago, Illinois, airport named in honor of Merrill C. Meigs
 Meigs County, Ohio
 Meigs County, Tennessee
 Meigs Township, Adams County, Ohio
 Meigs Township, Muskingum County, Ohio
 Meig's Key, in the Florida Keys
 Fort Meigs, a fortification in Ohio during the War of 1812
 Mount Meigs, Alabama

Ships
 USAT Meigs, a U.S. Army transport ship sunk early in World War II
 , a U.S. Navy transport ship in World War II

Other uses
Meigs (surname)
 Meigs-Bishop House, an historic building in Madison, Connecticut
 Meigs Elevated Railway, an experimental monorail once built in East Cambridge, Massachusetts
 Meigs High School, Pomeroy, Ohio
 Meigs Magnet School, Nashville, Tennessee
 Meigs Mountain Trail, hiking trail in the Great Smoky Mountains National Park
 Meigs's syndrome, a disorder of the female reproductive system

See also
Meiggs (disambiguation)